Margaret Stuart Barry (born Margaret Stuart Bell on 7 December 1927) is an English children's writer, and is best known for creating the Simon and the Witch series of books.  She has written other series for young readers, including the Attic Toys series.

Barry is from Darlington, County Durham, and was schooled in Richmond, North Yorkshire.

Select bibliography

 Boffy and the Teacher Eater (illustrated by George W. Adamson) (1971)
 Woozy (1973)
 Tommy Mac (1974)
 Simon and the Witch (1976)
 Maggie Gumption (1979)
 Tilly Losh, the Rag Doll (1995)
 Moggy, the Witches Cat (1995)
 Oxfam, the Unloved Bear (1995)
 Diz and the Big Fat Burglar (1996)
 Prissy, the Stuck Up Doll (1997)
 Mayor Bungle, the Mad Old Dog (1997)

References

Living people
British children's writers
1927 births
People from Darlington